Northen Etchells was a township in Cheshire, England.

"Northen" is an old name for Northenden and "Etchells" came from Anglo-Saxon ēcels = "land added to an estate".

Geography
Northen Etchells covered the rural area that includes much of modern-day Wythenshawe. As late as 1872, Northen Etchells was a township of moderately-sized farms and clusters of labourers' cottages around Hey Head, Moss Nook, Poundswick, Sharston, Crossacres and Brownlow Green.

To the north of Northen Etchells was the township of Northenden. Stockport Etchells lay to the east, Styal to the south with Baguley and Altrincham townships to the west.

History
Northen Etchells existed as a township from the Middle Ages until 1894.

Northen Etchells and Stockport Etchells were collectively called Etchells and often administered together from the 16th to 18th centuries.

Northen Etchells ceased to exist as an administrative body in 1894. Cheshire County Council was created (along with 61 others) in 1888. In 1894 Rural District Councils and Parish Councils replaced the old townships. Northen Etchells became part of Bucklow Rural District Council, electing one councillor to the council.

References

History of Cheshire
History of Manchester
Wythenshawe